CFAN-FM is a Canadian radio station broadcasting at 99.3 FM in Miramichi, New Brunswick, owned by the Maritime Broadcasting System. The station uses its on-air brand name as 99.3 The River with a country format.

History
CFAN originally began as CKMR on April 4, 1949 at 1340 AM. It moved to 790 in 1956. In 1973, CKMR's callsign had changed to CFAN. On July 2, 2002, CFAN was given approval by CRTC to switch to the FM band. On January 10, 2003, CFAN officially launched as an FM station at 99.3 MHz branded as 99.3 The River. On September 7, 2012 at 6 p.m., CFAN-FM changed its format from adult contemporary to country. The station's branding remained the same but the station's slogan was changed to "Today's Best Country".

References

External links
 99.3 The River
 
 

Fan
Fan
Fan
Mass media in Miramichi, New Brunswick
Radio stations established in 1949
1949 establishments in New Brunswick